Maggart is an English surname, a variant of Maggard. Notable people with the surname include:

Brandon Maggart (born 1933), American actor
Debra Maggart (born 1960), American politician
Fiona Apple McAfee-Maggart (born 1977), American singer-songwriter
Garett Maggart (born 1969), American actor
Maude Maggart (born 1975), American cabaret singer and recording artist

References

Surnames of English origin